Supermodels is a Romanian reality documentary and modeling competition hosted by designer Catalin Botezatu. Prior to hosting the show, Botezatu was the host of the [[Next Top Model Romania|Romanian adaptation of Tyra Banks' America's Next Top Model]].

After suffering from an illness the year after the filming of the third cycle of Next Top Model, the show entered a hiatus. Ultimately, Botezatu abandoned his role as head judge of the show, whose cancellation remains unconfirmed. Shortly after his departure, Botezatu took on the role of head judge and host on Supermodels. Supermodels more closely derives its format from The Face, although an official endorsement from the franchise does not exist.

The winner, Cătălin Bucur & Gabriela Prisacariu, received a contract with PackBackAge Concept in Paris.

Show format 
Each contestant is divided into an individual team in the beginning of the series. Generally the contestants participate in a weekly challenge. The segment is then followed by the models performing in a photo shoot. After the shoot, one team is saved from elimination, and two contestants from the losing teams are put up for elimination. The judges then decide which contestant will leave the competition. About two-thirds of the way through the competition, no team is saved from elimination. The judges nominate several contestants for elimination and vote on which of the nominated contestants they will eliminate.

Seasons

Cast

Contestants

Judges
Cătălin Botezatu
Gabriel Hennessey
Marius Baragan
Tourette Laurent

Results

 The contestant was part of the winning team for the episode.
 The contestant was in danger of elimination.
 The contestant was eliminated from the competition.
 The contestant was eliminated outside of judging panel.
 The contestant won the competition.

 Episodes 1-3 were casting episodes. 
 In episode 11, the blue team was dissolved. Dragos and Madalina, who were the last remaining members of that team, each joined one of the other remaining teams. 
 In episode 12, there was no elimination.
 In episode 13, Dragos was eliminated outside of judging panel.
 In episode 14, no team was safe from elimination. Alexandru M. and Liana from the green team & Joan and Laura from the pink team were in the bottom four. The panel deliberation ended in a tie to eliminate either Alexandru or Laura. Catalin broke the tie and chose to eliminate Laura.
 In episode 15, Alexandru M., Gilbert and Madalina were in the bottom three. The judges, only two of whom were present, voted unanimously to eliminate Alexandru.
 In episode 16, Catalin, Gilbert, Joan, and Madalina were in danger of elimination. The judges agreed on eliminating Gilbert and Madalina. The teams were dissolved at the end of the episode.

Photo shoots
Episode 4 photo shoots: Makeovers; nude on the beach
Episode 5 photo shoot: Fear factor in a bathtub
Episode 8 photo shoot: Royalty in Romanescu Park
Episode 10 photo shoot: Hanging from a skyscraper
Episode 11 photo shoot: Garbage couture
Episode 12 photo shoot: Covered in paint and powder
Episode 13 photo shoot: Posing on stilts in B&W
Episode 14 photo shoots: Buried inside a coffin; bats hanging upside down
Episode 15 photo shoots: James Bond couture on a rooftop; bright designs in a cave
Episode 16 photo shoots: Lingerie and underwear in a casino

See also
The Face
Next Top Model Romania

References

Romanian television series
Kanal D (Romania) original programming